, son of regent Michisaki with Tokugawa Kyohime, was a kugyō or Japanese court noble of the Edo period (1603–1868). He adopted a son of Nijō Harutaka, Suketsugu.

References
 

1769 births
1785 deaths
Fujiwara clan
Kujō family